Bezness (Arabic: بزناس) is a Tunisian film directed by Nouri Bouzid in 1992.

Synopsis 
Fred, a photographer, is in Tunisia to report on the « Bezness » (male prostitutes). Thanks to Roufa, Fred will discover this surprising environment where young men are confronted with the contradictions between tradition and modernity.

Roufa, who's handsome and tanned, wants to leave lives from his body. His dream was to leave Sousse. Europe has always fascinated and attracted. He has both double moral and behaviour standards. He tends to be very permissive with his customers, and repressive and conservative with the people around him, especially with his young fiancee, Khomsa. This movie is a portrait of the struggle of the youth, confronted with the contradictions between the west and the east, traditions and modernity.

Technical presentation 

 Director: Nouri Bouzid
 Scenario: Nouri Bouzid
 Editing: Kahéna Attia
 Images : Alain Levent
 Sound: Hachemi Joulak
 Music: Anouar Brahem
 Production:  Ahmed Bahaeddine Attia (Cinétéléfilms)
 Country of origin: Tunisia
 Language: Arabic
 Genre: Dramatic comedy

Actors 

 Mustapha Adouani
 Manfred Andrae
 Abdellatif Kechiche : Roufa
 Ghalia Lacroix : Khomsa
 Jacques Penot : Fred

External links

References 

Tunisian LGBT-related films
Gay-related films
1990s Arabic-language films
1992 films
1992 LGBT-related films